The Heinkel HD 22 was a trainer designed in Germany during the 1920s. It was a conventional single-bay biplane with staggered wings braced with N-type interplane struts. The pilot and instructor sat in tandem, open cockpits, and the main units of the fixed, tailskid undercarriage were linked by a cross-axle.

The main producer of the type was Manfred Weiss in Hungary, which built the design to equip the Hungarian Air Force, which was at that time masquerading as civil flying clubs. Around 30 aircraft were purchased, making this the most significant user of the type.

One HD 22 was purchased by the US Army Air Corps for use by the US military attache in Germany.

Operators

Hungarian Air Force

United States Army Air Corps

Specifications

See also

References

Further reading

External links

 1930-1937 USAAS Serial Numbers

1920s German civil trainer aircraft
HD 22
Aircraft first flown in 1926